Evan Frank Lysacek (born June 4, 1985) is an American retired figure skater. He is the 2010 Olympic champion, the 2009 World champion, a two-time (2005, 2007) Four Continents champion, the 2009 Grand Prix Final champion, and a two-time (2007, 2008) U.S. national champion. Lysacek was the 2010 United States Olympic Committee's SportsMan of the Year, and the winner of the James E. Sullivan Award as the top U.S. amateur athlete of 2010. On January 22, 2016, he was inducted into the U.S. Figure Skating Hall of Fame.

Personal life
Evan Lysacek was born in Chicago, Illinois, and raised in nearby Naperville. His mother, Tanya (née Santoro), is a substitute teacher in Naperville, and his father, Don, is a building contractor. He has an older sister, Laura, and a younger sister, Christina, who played on a nationally ranked volleyball team. His cousin Cole Chason is a former punter for the Clemson Tigers. Lysacek attended Tate Woods Elementary School in Lisle, Illinois, then he attended Spring Brook Elementary and Gregory Middle School. He graduated from Neuqua Valley High School in 2003. During high school, Lysacek was a member of the honor roll, where he earned a number of academic achievement awards, including the Presidential Award for Academic Excellence in 1999.

Lysacek is of half Czech descent; his paternal great-grandfather František Lysáček emigrated from Czechoslovakia's Moravia region to Chicago in 1925. On his maternal side, he is of one-quarter Italian descent. He is a Greek Orthodox Christian, having stated that one of his most prized possessions is his Orthodox cross. He wears Graf figure skating boots.

Lysacek moved to Los Angeles, California in 2003, following his graduation from high school. He owns homes in Chicago, Las Vegas, and El Segundo, California.

Lysacek studied acting, having taken method acting classes at the Professional Arts School in Beverly Hills. He appeared in the independent short film Skate Great!, playing a Russian Olympic gold medalist. He uses power yoga as conditioning training.

In September 2014, Lysacek moved to New York City to pursue a career in commercial real estate. In 2015, he started working for Vera Wang, his former costume designer. He became engaged to real estate developer Duangpatra "Dang" Bodiratnangkura in April 2019. They married in December 2019 in Bangkok, Thailand.

Career
Lysacek began skating at the age of eight. His grandmother had always wanted to be in the Ice Capades, so she bought him skates for Christmas. He originally wanted to play hockey, so his mother enrolled him and his sister Laura in figure-skating lessons to learn how to skate. Lysacek was soon competing as a figure skater.

Early career
In 1996, Lysacek won the U.S. national title at the Juvenile level – the lowest qualifying level in the U.S. Figure Skating competition structure. In 1997, he moved up to Intermediate and won the pewter medal (fourth place) at the Junior Olympics, after winning both his regional and his sectional qualifying competitions. After failing to qualify for Nationals on the novice level in 1998, Lysacek won the U.S. Novice title at the 1999 U.S. Championships at the age of thirteen.

Junior career

1999–2000 season
In the 1999–2000 season, Lysacek made his international junior debut and competed on the 1999–2000 ISU Junior Grand Prix circuit. He placed seventh at his first event and then won his second event. He was the third alternate to the 1999–2000 ISU Junior Grand Prix Final.

At the 2000 U.S. Championships, Lysacek won the Junior title at the age of fourteen. He placed fifth in the short program and first in the free skate, placing first overall. He was the first male skater since Terry Kubicka to win back-to-back Novice and Junior Men's titles in the United States. The win on the junior level was unusual in that Lysacek moved from third to first overall while sitting backstage, because he won through a tiebreak in the 6.0 ordinal system.

Lysacek was tied with Parker Pennington in second place ordinals and had one more first place ordinal, giving him the win in the free skate in the Total Ordinals of Majority tiebreaker, which pushed him ahead in overall factored placements, allowing him to win the title overall. Following the U.S. Championships, he was assigned to the 2000 Gardena Spring Trophy in Urtijëi where he won the silver medal on the junior level.

2000–2001 season
Lysacek had a strong showing in the 2000–2001 season. He competed in his second season on the Junior Grand Prix circuit and won two silver medals. He was the 7th qualifier for the 2000–2001 Junior Grand Prix Final and placed 8th at the Final.

He made his senior national debut at the 2001 U.S. Championships, placing 12th at the age of fifteen. Lysacek was named second alternate to the US team to the 2001 World Junior Championships and was placed on the team after Ryan Bradley withdrew due to injury. Lysacek performed two clean programs and came in second behind fellow American Johnny Weir, giving the United States a gold and a silver on the World Junior podium for the first time since 1987.

2001–2002 season
Over the next season, Lysacek dealt with several injuries, including broken ribs, which resulted in lost training time. After the September 11, 2001 attacks, the United States Figure Skating Association cancelled the 2001–2002 ISU Junior Grand Prix event to be held in Arizona and did not allow its junior skaters to compete on the Junior Grand Prix circuit for the rest of that season. At the 2002 U.S. Championships, Lysacek repeated his 12th-place finish from the previous year and was not selected for the team to the 2002 World Junior Championships. He was sent to the 2002 Triglav Trophy in April, where he won the gold medal on the junior level.

2002–2003 season
After that, Lysacek changed his diet and his training habits. In the 2002–2003 season, he competed on the 2002–2003 ISU Junior Grand Prix circuit and won two silver medals. He was the 4th qualifier for the 2002–2003 Junior Grand Prix Final, where he placed 5th. For the 2003 U.S. Championships, his goal had been to place in the top ten. He achieved this with a 7th-place finish.

Lysacek was named third alternate for the 2003 Four Continents Championships and was placed on the team after other skaters withdrew. He placed 10th at this event in his senior international debut. He was also named to the 2003 Junior Worlds team; following the withdrawal of Parker Pennington, the higher-ranked man on the two-man team, Lysacek was the only United States men's skater at the competition. He landed his first clean triple Axel jump of his career in the qualifying round of this competition and his second clean one in the free skate.

2003–2004 season

After graduating from high school in 2003, Lysacek made a coaching change and began to work with Ken Congemi and Frank Carroll in El Segundo, California. With Congemi and Carroll, Lysacek won both of his Junior Grand Prix events. He was the second qualifier to the 2003–2004 Junior Grand Prix Final and won the event. He placed 5th at the 2004 U.S. Championships. At the 2004 Four Continents he won the bronze medal, his first senior-level international medal. He then went on to compete at the 2004 World Junior Championships, where he won a third silver medal.

Senior career

2004–2005 season
In the 2004–2005 season, having aged out of the junior level at age 19, Evan Lysacek made his senior international debut. Skating through a hip injury, Lysacek placed fifth at the 2004 Skate America, the first Grand Prix event of his career. He repeated that placement a few weeks later at the 2004 Cup of Russia. At the 2005 U.S. Championships, Lysacek won the bronze medal after receiving the only 6.0 of his career for his short program. He went on to win his first senior international title at the 2005 Four Continents. He competed next at the 2005 World Championships in Moscow. There, he won a surprising bronze medal at his first senior World Championships, a competition for which his goal had been only to qualify for the free skate.

2005–2006 season
In the 2005–2006 season, Lysacek again competed on the Grand Prix. He placed second at the 2005 Skate America, but it was clear that his Grease free skate was not working. Lysacek and coach Frank Carroll made the decision to find a new long program. Lysacek's new Carmen program was a success at the 2005 NHK Trophy, where Lysacek placed second. Lysacek was the only American man to qualify for the 2005–2006 Grand Prix Final, but he withdrew before the event because of bursitis and tendinitis in his right hip.

At the 2006 U.S. Championships, the de facto Olympic qualifier, Lysacek was third after the short program, but pulled up to win the free skate, finishing second overall. He was named to the 2006 Winter Olympic team along with Johnny Weir and Matthew Savoie. At the Olympics, following a 10th-place finish in the short program, Lysacek became sick with the stomach flu. Unable to practice, he stayed in bed at the Olympic village, receiving fluids from IVs. After considering withdrawing, he decided to skate the next day and went on to skate a career-best free skate. He finished his free skate with eight triple jumps and was ranked third of the night. He finished fourth overall, seven points below the bronze. He commentated on his free-skating program on Olympic Ice the next day with Scott Hamilton and Mary Carillo.

Lysacek ended his season by winning the bronze medal at the 2006 World Championships in Calgary, Alberta. He was once again troubled by illness, having been administered three different antibiotics to fight a bacterial infection, which at one point, caused him to cough up blood. He rose from seventh place in the short to finish third on the strength of his free-skating program. After the World Championships, Lysacek toured with Champions on Ice as a full member of the cast.

2006–2007 season
In the 2006–2007 season, Lysacek placed second at the 2006 Skate America. Two weeks later, Lysacek won the gold medal at the 2006 Cup of China by a 20-point margin. He was the fourth qualifier for the 2006–2007 Grand Prix Final in his second consecutive year in qualifying for the event. However, he withdrew from the competition before he was to skate his short program due to an injury to his hip.

Lysacek resumed training a few weeks later. At the 2007 U.S. Championships, he performed his first clean short program of the season, then went on to land his first clean quadruple jump in competition, a quadruple toe loop-triple toe loop jump, in the long program, to win his first national title. A week later, Lysacek competed in the 2007 Four Continents. He was fourth after the short program, but made yet another comeback in the free skate, landing a clean quadruple combination, to earn a new personal best and to win his second Four Continents title.

At the 2007 World Championships, Lysacek made his first attempt at landing a quadruple jump in the short program. He attempted a quad-triple, but stepped out of the quad and put his hand down, and followed it with a double. He placed fifth in the short program and earned himself his first new short program personal best in two years. In the long program, he completed a quadruple toe-loop as the first part of a quad-triple combination, but lost control of the landing, adding a three turn after it, and was unable to complete the following triple as intended. He performed a double loop instead of a planned triple loop and placed fifth once again in the long program, placing fifth over all.

Lysacek toured over the summer of 2007 with Champions on Ice for the second consecutive year.

2007–2008 season
Lysacek began the 2007–2008 season at the 2007 Skate America. He underrotated and fell on an attempted quadruple toe loop-triple toe loop in the short program, receiving only one point for that element. He was in second place going into the free skate. He won the free skate, landing a clean quadruple jump, but was unable to pull up to first overall, due to Daisuke Takahashi's twelve point lead after the short program. He went on to the 2007 Cup of China, where he won the short program with a score of 81.55, improving his personal best by almost thirteen points. He placed second in the free skate after falling on his quadruple jump, and finished second overall to Johnny Weir.

At the 2007–2008 Grand Prix Final, Lysacek was credited with a quadruple jump in both his programs and won the bronze medal overall, after placing third in both segments of the competition. He earned a new overall personal best of 229.78 points.

At the 2008 U.S. Championships, Lysacek was second after the short program and won the free skate. Although he tied with Johnny Weir on the overall score, Lysacek won the title on the tiebreaker, thereby earning his second national title.

His next event was the 2008 Four Continents, where he placed second in the short program and third in the free skate, and finished third overall. Lysacek was also named to the team for the 2008 World Championships. A week before the event, he was forced to withdraw due to an injury sustained while attempting a triple Axel; the blade broke off of his boot and he injured the left side of his body, from his forearm to his shoulder, and required a cast. Lysacek toured over the summer of 2008 with the Stars on Ice tour.

2008–2009 season
Lysacek began the 2008–2009 season at the 2008 Skate America, where he won the bronze medal. The following week, he competed at the 2008 Skate Canada International, where he won a second bronze medal. Lysacek was the second alternate for the 2008–2009 Grand Prix Final.

At the 2009 U.S. Championships, Lysacek placed second in the short program, 2.81 points behind leader Jeremy Abbott and 7.42 points ahead of third-place finisher Parker Pennington. In the free skate, Lysacek fell on his quadruple combination attempt and placed fourth in that segment of the competition. He won the bronze medal overall, placing 0.60 points behind silver medalist Brandon Mroz and 7.70 points ahead of pewter medalist Ryan Bradley. Due to his placement at the U.S. Championships, Lysacek was named to the teams to the 2009 Four Continents Championships and the 2009 World Championships.

At the 2009 Four Continents, Lysacek placed second in the short program, 7.25 points behind leader Patrick Chan. He placed second in the free skating segment as well, placing 4.79 behind Chan. He won the silver medal overall by a margin of 15.39 points ahead of bronze medalist Takahiko Kozuka.

At the 2009 World Championships, Lysacek placed second in the short program. He then won the free skating segment to win the competition overall, becoming the first American man since Todd Eldredge in 1996 to win the World title. His placement, combined with that of Brandon Mroz, qualified the United States for three entries in the men's event at the 2010 Winter Olympics. At the World Championships, Lysacek competed with a stress fracture in his left foot, which prevented him from trying a quadruple jump at the competition. During the off-season, Lysacek took two months off from skating to give the injury time to heal. He was called the frontrunner for the 2010 Olympic gold by some journalists.

During the later part of the season and during the off-season, Lysacek toured with Stars on Ice.

2009–2010 season

Lysacek began the 2009–2010 season at the 2009 Cup of China, where he placed third in the short program and second in the free skating to win the silver medal overall. Afterwards he went on to the 2009 Skate America, where he won both segments of the competition and won the gold medal overall in his sixth time competing at Skate America. Lysacek was the second qualifier for the 2009–2010 Grand Prix Final.

At the Grand Prix Final, Lysacek placed second in the short program and won the free skating to win the title overall. He became the second consecutive American to win the title, following Jeremy Abbott's win the year before. At the 2010 U.S. Championships, he placed second in the short program and third in the free skating to win the silver medal overall. He was named to the Olympic team.

At the 2010 Winter Olympics, Lysacek placed second in the short program, with a score of 90.30 without quadruple jumps.  He won the free skate with a score of 167.37 and won the gold medal overall with a total score of 257.67, a margin of 1.31 over silver medalist Evgeni Plushenko. He became the first American to win the Olympic title in men's singles since Brian Boitano in 1988, and the first reigning world champion to win since Scott Hamilton in 1984.

He had originally been named to the team for the 2010 World Championships. He withdrew from the World team following his win at the Olympics.

Lysacek was the recipient of the prestigious James E. Sullivan Award (2010), which is given to America's best amateur athlete; he was the fourth figure skater to win the award after Dick Button in 1949, Michelle Kwan in 2001 and Sarah Hughes in 2002.

2010–present
Lysacek did not skate competitively in 2010–2011 but did not announce a retirement.

In June 2011, he received two Grand Prix assignments for the 2011–2012 season – 2011 Skate America and 2011 Trophée Eric Bompard. He resumed training with Frank Carroll at Lake Arrowhead, California, and his publicist said he would make a decision whether to compete later in the summer. In September, he announced that his goal was to participate in the 2014 Winter Olympics. In October, U.S. Figure Skating announced that he would not compete at the 2011 Skate America due to a financial disagreement, and Lysacek confirmed that he would not take part in the Grand Prix series, explaining on his Twitter that "a suitable agreement could not be reached between U.S. Figure Skating and myself by the event entry deadline". In November, Lysacek confirmed he would not enter the 2012 U.S. Championships in January 2012 but negotiations with U.S. Figure Skating continued.

On August 10, 2012, U.S. Figure Skating announced that an agreement had been reached and Lysacek would return to competition at the 2012 Skate America. He withdrew after aggravating a groin injury. On November 20, 2012, Lysacek underwent surgery to repair a torn muscle in his lower abdomen, i.e. a sports hernia, with an expected period of six weeks off the ice. In January 2013, he withdrew from the 2013 U.S. Championships, saying he was healthy but needed an additional three weeks to return to competition form. Carroll said it would be a long recovery.

On June 3, 2013, it was announced that Lysacek would compete at one ISU Grand Prix of Figure Skating event, the 2013 Skate America. However, on September 30, 2013, it was announced that he had withdrawn. On December 10, 2013, Lysacek announced on The Today Show that he would not attempt to qualify for the 2014 Winter Olympics in Sochi, due to the labrum injury which he sustained in September.

On August 30, 2014, during a TV interview, Lysacek mentioned his competitive skating career was coming to an end.

On December 15, 2015, U.S. Figure Skating announced Lysacek would be a member of the U.S. Figure Skating Hall of Fame Class of 2016. The induction ceremony was held on January 22, 2016, at the 2016 U.S. Figure Skating Championships.

Coaches and choreographers

Evan Lysacek was originally coached by Candice Brown in Naperville. After that, he worked with Deborah Stoery in Naperville, Illinois and Addison, Illinois for three years. For the next two years, he had an arrangement where he would train under both Addison-based Maria Jeżak-Athey and Moscow-based Viktor Kudriavtsev. Kudriavtsev would come to Chicago for part of the year to coach, and Lysacek spent his summers at Kudriavtsev's summer training camps in Moscow, Russia and Flims, Switzerland. When that arrangement proved untenable, Kudriavtsev recommended Lysacek to Carroll, who agreed to coach Lysacek on the condition that Lysacek would work more with Congemi than with himself, due to Carroll's commitments to Timothy Goebel. Lysacek moved to El Segundo, California to work with Frank Carroll and Ken Congemi in June 2003. Lysacek worked with both Congemi and Carroll through the 2006–2007 season, after which he began working solely with Carroll. He has also trained with ballerina Galina Barinova.

Lysacek trained with Carroll at the Toyota Sports Center in El Segundo, California. After Carroll moved to Palm Springs, they decided to meet midway at the Ice Castle International Training Center in Lake Arrowhead and Ontario, California, and Karen Kwan-Oppegard coached him at the East West Ice Palace in Artesia, California. In June 2013, Carroll moved back to the Toyota Sports Center.

Lysacek has worked with many choreographers over the years, including Oleg Epstein and Kurt Browning. Both his programs for the 2007–2008 season were choreographed by Lori Nichol. He worked with Tatiana Tarasova on his programs for the 2008–2009 season. He returned to Nichol for the 2009–2010 season.

Endorsements and public life
Lysacek supports a number of charities. He participated in Target – A Time for Heroes, a celebrity charity event benefiting the Elizabeth Glaser Pediatric AIDS Foundation. He also supports the Dana–Farber Cancer Institute (Jimmy Fund). He began supporting Figure Skating in Harlem in 2006 and is a board member of the charity. Lysacek has attended their benefit gala in New York City regularly.

Following his win at the 2009 World Figure Skating Championships, Lysacek acquired many sponsors, including Coca-Cola, AT&T, and Ralph Lauren. He also served as a spokesperson for Total Gym. In 2011, he switched agents from International Management Group to Creative Artists Agency. Lysacek left Creative Artists Agency in April 2012 and was represented by Shep Goldberg until his death in November 2014.

In April 2012, the U.S. Department of State's Bureau of Educational and Cultural Affairs named Lysacek a Sports Envoy.

Costumes
In the past, Lysacek has worn costumes designed by Christian Dior, Gianfranco Ferre, Alexander McQueen, and Vera Wang, American fashion designer and former figure skater. Wang created the mock tuxedo Lysacek wore when he won the 2009 World Championships. Lysacek and Wang also collaborated to design his costumes for the 2010 Winter Olympics, as well as those worn for the rest of the 2009–2010 season.

Dancing with the Stars 

Lysacek was a celebrity contestant on Dancing with the Stars for the tenth season, which premiered on Monday, March 22, 2010. He and his professional dance partner Anna Trebunskaya made it to the finals and finished in second place to Nicole Scherzinger and Derek Hough.

Programs

Post-2014

Pre-2014

Competitive highlights

GP: Grand Prix; JGP: Junior Grand Prix

Detailed results
Small medals for short program and free skating awarded only at ISU Championships. At team events, medals awarded for team results only.

Senior career

References

External links

 
 
 
 
 
 
 

American male single skaters
Figure skaters at the 2006 Winter Olympics
Olympic figure skaters of the United States
Sportspeople from Naperville, Illinois
Figure skaters from Los Angeles
American people of Czech descent
American people of Italian descent
1985 births
Living people
Figure skaters at the 2010 Winter Olympics
Olympic gold medalists for the United States in figure skating
Participants in American reality television series
James E. Sullivan Award recipients
World Figure Skating Championships medalists
Four Continents Figure Skating Championships medalists
World Junior Figure Skating Championships medalists
Medalists at the 2010 Winter Olympics
Season-end world number one figure skaters
Sportspeople from the Chicago metropolitan area